Harry Verdon Stopes-Roe (27 March 1924 – 11 May 2014) was a British philosopher known mainly for his active role in the humanist movement in Britain and around the world. He was a Vice-President of the British Humanist Association until his death in May 2014, having served as its Chair previously.

Biography
Born in London, he was the son of Marie Stopes, the women's rights and family planning pioneer, and Humphrey Verdon Roe.  He started his career as a physicist, and received a BSc and MSc in physics from Imperial College, London. Thanks to studying physics he was exempt from military call-up during the Second World War. He then went to Cambridge University, and took a PhD in philosophy.

After he married a short-sighted woman, his mother, an advocate of eugenics, cut him out of her will. His wife—Mary Eyre Wallis, later Mary Stopes-Roe—was the daughter of the noted engineer Barnes Wallis. Stopes reasoned that prospective grandchildren might inherit the condition.

Stopes-Roe became a lecturer in Science Studies at Birmingham University, bringing together physics with philosophy.  His work led him to seek a non-religious basis for morality in Humanism, and he became Chair of the British Humanist Association as well as having an active role in the International Humanist and Ethical Union (IHEU).

In the 1970s, he was largely responsible for developing the BHA's policy on education, covering both religious and non-religious life stances.  Stopes-Roe invented and popularised the term "life stance", initially in the context of debates over the controversial content of the City of Birmingham's Agreed Syllabus for Religious Education in 1975, which referred to "non-religious stances for living", as did the subsequent British Humanist Association (BHA) booklet "Objective, Fair and Balanced" which he and David Pollock produced later in the same year. In the late 1980s, he initiated a successful campaign for the adoption of the term by the IHEU and other organisations.

He represented the BHA on the Religious Education Council and he led the Values Education Council for many years. He was also president of Birmingham Humanists prior to his death. In 1986, along with Barbara Smoker, he became one of the last two Appointed Lecturers at the South Place Ethical Society, a position he retained until his death, though the Conway Hall Sunday Lectures have not been given by Appointed Lecturers for many years.

He died at the age of 90 on 11 May 2014.

References

1924 births
2014 deaths
Alumni of Imperial College London
Alumni of the University of Cambridge
British humanists
20th-century British philosophers
21st-century British philosophers
Academics of the University of Birmingham